Morley Glacier is a steep tributary to Carryer Glacier, flowing south between Hicks Ridge and Mount Tokoroa in the Explorers Range of the Bowers Mountains in Antarctica. It was mapped by the United States Geological Survey from ground surveys and U.S. Navy air photos, 1960–62, and was named by the Advisory Committee on Antarctic Names after Australian International Geophysical Year observer Keith T. Morley, Weather Central Meteorologist at Little America V in 1958.

External links 

 Morley Glacier on USGS website
 Morley Glacier on the Antarctica New Zealand Digital Asset Manager website
 Morley Glacier on AADC website
 Morley Glacier on SCAR website
 Morley Glacier area map

References 

Glaciers of Pennell Coast